Piu is an Oceanic language in the upper Watut River area of Morobe Province, Papua New Guinea.

References

South Huon Gulf languages
Definitely endangered languages
Languages of Morobe Province